The Global Energy Prize is an international award in the field of energy industry which is given for "outstanding scientific research and scientific-technical developments in the field of energy which promote greater efficiency and environmental security for energy sources on Earth in the interests of all mankind".

It was founded in 2002 at the initiative of a Nobel Prize in Physics laureate Zhores Alferov. The headquarters are in Moscow, Russia. The prize is awarded by the President of Russia or "a person authorized by the president". The media and the professional community consider it "a biggest Russian award" and "one of the biggest in the world". Some depictions in the press described it as "a Russian analogue to the Nobel prize". This is confirmed by the IREG Observatory on Academic Ranking and Excellence which includes the Prize in its "top-99" list of the most recognized global awards. It is the only award from Russia included in this list.

The award is managed by The Global Energy Association, which is dedicated to the development of international research and projects in energy industry. Besides award, the Association oversees conferences and informational programmes in this field, programmes for younger scientists and produces an annual report "Ten breakthrough ideas in energy for the next 10 years".

History 

The author of the concept was Zhores Alferov, Russian Nobel-winning physicist (2000), academician of the Russian Academy of Sciences. The prize was created in 2002 and Alferov was appointed the head of the International Committee for its awarding. The founders of the prize were PJSC Gazprom, PJCS Federal Grid Company of the Unified Energy Systems (FGC UES, Former JSC Unified Energy Systems of Russia) and Yukos. The creation of the prize was announced by Vladimir Putin at the 2002 Russia—European Union Summit.

The first Global Energy Prize award ceremony took place in June 2003 at the Konstantinovsky Palace, Strelna (St Petersburg) and was attended by President Putin. The award was presented to three scientists: Nick Holonyak (USA), a professor at the University of Illinois, "for his invention of the first semiconductor LEDs (light-emitting diodes) in the visible region of the light spectrum, and his role as founder of the new field of silicon electronics and micro-electronics for power applications"; Ian Douglas Smith (USA), chief manager and senior researcher in Titan Pulse Sciences Division company, "for fundamental research into the physics of high-power pulse-energy engineering, and the development of pulsed power in electron accelerator applications", and a Russian scientist Gennady Mesyats for the same.

For the prize's management, the Global Energy Prize Foundation was established. It was functional until 2010 and, besides the prize, launched a number of energy-related programs. In 2010 it was converted into a voluntary association, and in October 2016 it was renamed into The Association for the development of international research and projects in the energy sector "Global Energy". As of 2021, the Association's members are Gazprom, "Rosseti FGC UES" and Surgutneftegaz.

Activities 
In 2020, the association broadened its geographical presence, so a new record was set in the 2021 nomination cycle. For the first time, 36 countries were represented on the long list — three times the number in 2019 (12 countries) and nearly twice the number in 2020 (20 countries).

The 2021 list features scientists not only from North America, Western Europe and Asia, but also from Eastern Europe — Hungary and Latvia — from the Middle East and from Africa — Algeria, Burkina Faso, Cameroon, Ghana, Gambia, Egypt, Jordan, Madagascar, Nigeria, Togo and Zimbabwe — and from Latin America — Mexico and Uruguay. And for the first time, women were among the candidates — from India, Kazakhstan, the United States and Zimbabwe.
In 2020, new members joined the Board of Trustees — the former president of Uruguay, Julio Maria Sanguinetti Coirolo, and the General Director, Association of Power Utilities of Africa (APUA), Abel Didier Tella. The new President of the Global Energy Association became Sergey Brilev, a prominent Russian TV journalist and manager. The former presidents were Igor Lobovsky (2003–2018) and Alexander Ignatov (2018–2020).

As of 2021, the monetary part of the award amounted to 39 million of russian rubles (530,000 USD). The association, besides award, oversees energy-related conferences and informational projects, programmes for younger scientists with participation of honoured experts. It also produces an annual report "Ten breakthrough ideas in energy for the next 10 years". Since 2020, the ceremony has been held in different cities of Russia: the first location to be selected was the Tsiolkovsky State Museum of the History of Cosmonautics in Kaluga. 

Up to now, the last awarding ceremony took place in autumn 2021.

In 2020, along with the existing Global Energy Prize, a new type of award was established: Honorary Diploma of the Association, for Russian scientists contributing to the energy industry of the Russian Federation. The first laureate was mathematician Viktor Maslov — for "fundamental input into the safety of nuclear energy". In 2021 the Association presented its diploma to physicist Igor Grekhov.

International Award Committee 

The International Award Committee is responsible for choosing the laureates of the Global Energy Prize. It includes:

 Rae Kwon Chung (Republic of Korea): Member of the Intergovernmental Panel on Climate Change (IPCC), awarded with the Nobel Peace Prize in 2007, Professor Emeritus at Institute of Convergence, Science and Technology of Incheon National University
 Adnan Amin (USA): Senior Researcher of Harvard University, Director General Emeritus of the International Renewable Energy Agency (IRENA) 
 Thomas Albert Blees: (USA): President of the Science Council for Global Initiatives (SCGI)
 Marta Bonifert (Hungary): Vice President, Institute of Directors Hungary (IoD), Member of the global advisory board of Tokyo University
 Frederick Bordry (Switzerland): Director for Accelerators and Technology of European Council for Nuclear Research (CERN)
 William Il Young Byun (Singapore/Republic of Korea/USA): Managing Director at Asia Renewables, Head of Greenpower Fuels, and Principal at Conchubar Infrastructure Fund, Independent Director at the International Green Technologies and Investment Projects Center
 Nikolay Voropay (Russia): Scientific Adviser of Melentiev Energy Systems Institute Siberian Branch of the Russian Academy of Sciences, Corresponding Member of the Russian Academy of Sciences (RAS)
 Steven Griffiths (USA/UAE): Senior Vice President, Research and Development Professor of Practice, Khalifa University of Science and Technology
 Aleksey Kontorovich (Russia): Chief researcher, Laboratory of Theoretical Bases of Oil and Gas Potential of the Forecast of IPGG SB RAS, RAS Academician
 Nikolay Kudryavtsev (Russia): Independent Director, Sberbank
 Dietrich Moeller (Germany): Consultant of German-Russian Chamber of Commerce
 Yury Petrenya (Russia): Chair of the Energy and Electric Engineering, Peter the Great St. Petersburg Polytechnic University 
 Nikolay Rogalev (Russia): Rector of Moscow Power Engineering Institute (MPEI)
 Xiansheng Sun (China): Director General of Energy Industry Cooperation, Vice President of China Council for International Trade Promotion, Honorary Professor, University of Dundee
 Liye Xiao (China): Director of Applied Superconductivity Laboratory, CAS, Director Of Interdisciplinary Research Center Institute of Electrical Engineering, CAS
 Nobuo Tanaka (Japan/USA): Special Advisor, the Sasakawa Peace Foundation (SPF), CEO, Tanaka Global, Inc.
 David Faiman (Israel): Professor Emeritus of Ben-Gurion University of the Negev

Board of Trustees 

The Board of Trustees of the Association is responsible for supervision of its general management. It includes:
 Oleg Budargin: Chairman of The Board Of Trustees, Vice-Chairman of The World Energy Council Vice-Chairman of The Global Energy Interconnection Development And Cooperation Organisation (GEIDCO)
 Vladimir Bogdanov: CEO, Surgutneftegas
 Mikhail Gorbachev: President, International Fund for Socio-economic and political research (Gorbachev Foundation)
 Mikhail Gutseriev: Chairman of the Board, Russneft
 Arkady Dvorkovich: Co-chairman of the Skolkovo Foundation
 Alexei Likhachev: Director General, Rosatom
 Alexei Miller: Chairman of the management committee, Gazprom
 Andrei Murov: First Deputy General Director — Executive Director, Rosseti
 Alexander Novak: Russian Deputy Prime Minister
 Vyacheslav Solomin: Chief Operating Officer, En+ Group      	
 Abdel Didier Tella (Ivory Coast): General Director, Association of Power Utilities of Africa (APUA)
 Julio Maria Sanguinetti Coirolo (Uruguay): Honorary Doctor, University of Brazil, Lomonosov Moscow State University (Russia), National University of Asuncion (Paraguay), Universiti Malaya (Malaysia), University of Genoa (Italy), University of Bucharest (Romania), Universidad del Rosario (Colombia), Universidad de Alicante (Spain)

Laureates 
Since 2003, 45 scientists from 15 countries were awarded. Among them people from Australia, the UK, Germany, Greece, Denmark, Iceland, Italy, Canada, Russia, the US, Ukraine, France, Switzerland, Sweden and Japan. The laureates are presented an honorary medal, a statuette, a diploma and a golden honorary pin (besides monetary amount).

Nominations are accepted from scientists and/or organizations through representatives. They have to be preliminarily authorized by the Association. Among them are Nobel prize laureates, laureates of prizes such as Kyoto Prize, Max Planck Prize, Wolf Prize, Balzan Prize, past Global Energy Prize laureates.

References

External links 

 Prize's English website

Science and technology awards